Black flathead is a common name for several Australian fishes and may refer to:

Platycephalus fuscus, native to eastern Australia
Platycephalus laevigatus, native to southern Australia

See also
Pylodictis olivaris, flathead catfish, native to eastern North America